The Sleeping Giant is a series of mesas formed by the erosion of thick, basaltic sills on Sibley Peninsula which resembles a giant lying on its back when viewed from the west to north-northwest section of Thunder Bay, Ontario, Canada. As one moves southward along the shoreline toward Sawyer's Bay the Sleeping Giant starts to separate into its various sections. Most distinctly in the view from the cliffs at Sawyer's Bay the Giant appears to have an Adam's Apple. The formation is part of Sleeping Giant Provincial Park. Its dramatic steep cliffs are among the highest in Ontario (250 m). The southernmost point is known as Thunder Cape, depicted by many early Canadian artists such as William Armstrong.

One Ojibway legend identifies the giant as Nanabijou, who was turned to stone when the secret location of a rich silver mine now known as Silver Islet was disclosed to white men.

Sleeping Giant is the namesake and general setting of the 2015 Canadian film Sleeping Giant.

Seven Wonders of Canada 
It was voted number one for a list of Seven Wonders of Canada, with a total of 177,305 votes, beating the Bay of Fundy and Niagara Falls by almost 90,000 votes.
Ultimately it was not selected by the panel of judges, Ra McGuire, Roberta Jamieson and Roy MacGregor, who decided their vote by geographic and poetic criteria
.

See also
 Nanabozho
Mount Susitna
 Sibley Peninsula
 Silver Islet, Ontario
 Sleeping Giant Provincial Park

References 
 Ontario Parks Sleeping Giant Background Information (2003) Queen's Printer for Ontario. . Retrieved on 26 September 2007.

External links 
 Information on the Sleeping Giant Provincial Park
 Sleeping Giant Background Information
 Information from the City of Thunder Bay on the Park

Landforms of Thunder Bay District
Anishinaabe mythology
Sills (geology)
Rock formations of Canada
Igneous petrology of Ontario